The Nottinghamshire Senior League is an English football league. The competition is a feeder to the Northern Counties East League and the United Counties League. The league has five divisions – the Premier Division (which stands at level 11 of the English football league system), NSL Division One, NSL Division Two, NSL Division Three and the NSL Development Division.  The league expanded from three divisions in 2020 having absorbed the Midland & Notts Alliance League.

History
It was founded in 2004 to replace the Nottinghamshire Football Alliance League as the top league within the county of Nottinghamshire.

Current member clubs (2022–23)

Premier Division
AFC Dunkirk
AFC Top Valley
Aslockton & Orston
Awsworth Villa
Basford CFC
Borrowash Victoria
Clifton All Whites FCB
Cotgrave
FC Sez
Keyworth United
Radcliffe Olympic
Ravenshead
Sandiacre Town
Stapleford Town
West Bridgford Colts II
Wollaton
Woodthorpe Park Rangers

NSL Division One
AC United
Beeston
Beeston Old Boys Association
Bestwood Colliery
Bilborough Town
Bingham Town
East Leake Robins
FC Cavaliers
FC Geordie
Gedling Southbank
Hucknall Town Reserves
Kimberley Miners Welfare Reserves
Kirton Brickworks
Meden Vale Colts
Pass Move Grin Elite
Radford Reserves
Ruddington Village
Southwell City Reserves
Stapleford Town Reserves

NSL Division Two
AJ Sports
Blidworth Welfare Red
Bull Farm United
Calverton Miners' Welfare
Carlton Town Lions
FC Mansfield
FC Pelican
Fernwood Foxes
Greyfriars
Keyworth United Reserves
Phoenix Top Spot
Pythian
Rushcliffe
Shirebrook Soldiers
South Notts AFC
West Bridgford Colts III
Wollaton Reserves

NSL Division Three
AFC Bull Farm
AFC Colsterworth Sports & Social
Arnold Town Reserves
Carlton Town Lions Blue
Cotgrave Reserves
Eastwood & Kimberley
Elston United
Pass Move Grin Reserves
Phoenix Inham
Ravenshead Reds
Southwell City Development
The Rossoneri
Trent Vineyard
Wollaton Development

NSL Development Division
Basford CFC U21
Beeston Reserves
Bingham Town Development
Great Gonerby
Meden Vale Colts Development
Nottingham Community
Pegasus Development
West Bridgford Colts Development

Champions

External links
 Nottinghamshire Senior League Official Website
 Nottinghamshire Senior League on Full-Time

 
Football in Nottinghamshire
Football leagues in England
Sports leagues established in 2004
2004 establishments in England